Catherine Murphy is a U.S. filmmaker, activist and educator, best known for her documentary film MAESTRA about the 1961 Cuban Literacy Campaign. Her work principally focuses on social justice and literacy in the Americas. Murphy founded The Literacy Project in 2004 and Tres Musas Producciones in 2009.

Early life 

Murphy was raised on the campus of Stanford University, where her parents both studied. Growing up, she was influenced by her grandmother and great-aunt, both of whom had lived in Cuba at the turn of the 20th century.

Time in Cuba 
Murphy studied in Havana during the 1990s in what is known as Cuba's Special Period. While living in Havana, Murphy earned a master's degree in sociology from the Facultad Latinoamericana de Ciencias Sociales. An early version of her thesis was published by the Institute for Food and Development Policy in 1999, under the title “Cultivating Havana: Urban agriculture and food security in the years of crisis”.

Based on this work, she gave one of the 2010 keynote speeches to the Northeast Organic Farming Association.

Filmography 

Catherine Murphy has earned the following credits for her film work:

MAESTRA

Director/Producer. MAESTRA (Teacher). Documentary. US/Cuba. 2012.
 
Maestra is distributed by Women Make Movies.

Maestra has been included in the recommended curriculum resources of the Zinn Education Project

Maestra at the International Documentary Festival “OXDOX”

Other films

 Director, Silvio Rodriguez: Mi primera tarea. Documentary. US/Cuba. 2020.
 Executive Producer. Miss. Documentary. Dir Flor Salcedo. Venezuela/USA. 
 Associate Producer. Will the Real Terrorist Please Stand Up? Documentary. Dir: Saul Landau. USA. 2011.
 Associate Producer. From Ghost Town to Havana. Documentary. Dir Eugene Corr, 2013
 Archive Researcher. Sing Your Song: The Life of Harry Belafonte. Dir Susane Rostock. USA. 2010.
 Subtitle Editor. Stealing America: Vote By Vote. Documentary. Dir Dorothy Fadiman. 2008. 
 Subtitle Editor. The Greening of Cuba. Dir Jaime Kibben. USA. 1997 
 Production Assistant. Gay Cuba. Documentary. Dir Sonja de Vries. USA. 1994

Teaching 

Murphy is an adjunct professor at New York University's Center for Global Affairs, where she teaches a graduate course on the culture and history of Havana.

The Literacy Project
Murphy founded The Literacy Project in 2004 to explore issues of literacy and illiteracy in the Americas. As a result of her studies in Havana in the 1990s, she met several women who volunteered on the Cuban Literacy Campaign. In 1961, the Cuban government aimed to eradicate illiteracy across the island in the space of one year. It sent 250,000 volunteers across Cuba to teach reading and writing in rural communities for 12 months. 100,000 of the volunteers were under 18 and more than half of them were women.

In 2004, just before Murphy was to leave Havana and return to the United States, she decided to record three interviews with former Literacy Campaign volunteers. From 2004 to 2010, she continued to track down stories of Literacy Campaign volunteers and the families that hosted them, eventually producing and directing MAESTRA and founding The Literacy Project.

The Literacy Project now works to collect oral histories and uses a variety of media and documentation methodologies to capture the history of adult literacy work throughout the Americas.

References

External links 
 MAESTRA: a documentary film by Catherine Murphy (Official Website)
 The Literacy Project
 An interview with Catherine Murphy from Festival de Cine Global
 Catherine Murphy speaks about MAESTRA at Michael Moore’s Traverse City Film Festival
 MAESTRA as educational material on Teaching A People's History, a Zinn Education Project and Vanderbilt University's Center for Latin American Studies.

American documentary filmmakers
American film directors
Living people
Year of birth missing (living people)
American women documentary filmmakers
21st-century American women